Thecideidae is a family of brachiopods belonging to the order Thecideida.

Genera

Genera:
 Ancorellina Mancenido & Damborenea, 1991
 Backhausina
 Danella Pajaud, 1966

References

Brachiopods